Saeed Ghezelagchi (born March 6, 1983) is an Iranian football player who currently plays for Paykan of the Iran Pro League.

Professional
Ghezelagchi has played for Saipa since 2009.

References

1983 births
Living people
Iranian footballers
Sportspeople from Tabriz
Saipa F.C. players
Fajr Sepasi players
Machine Sazi F.C. players
Naft Tehran F.C. players
Esteghlal Ahvaz players
Shahr Khodro F.C. players
Association football defenders